Ritchiella is a genus of grasshoppers in the subfamily Cyrtacanthacridinae with species found in Africa.

Species 

The following species are recognised in the genus Ritchiella:

 Ritchiella asperata (Bolívar, 1882)
 Ritchiella baumanni (Karsch, 1896)
 Ritchiella rungwensis Mungai, 1992
 Ritchiella sanguinea (Sjöstedt, 1912)
 Ritchiella uvarovi (Sjöstedt, 1924)

References 

Acrididae